The Young Widow is a fable of Italian origin, made famous by being included in La Fontaine's Fables (VI.21). Originally a cynical attack on female inconstancy, later treatments were more thoughtful.

The Fable
The fable originally appeared in Laurentius Abstemius' collection of humorous fables, the Hecatomythium (1492).  

Soon afterwards a close translation appeared in the English jest book Merry Tales and Quick Answers (c.1530), but in general the trend among later fabulists has been to embroider upon the rather threadbare narration of Abstemius. La Fontaine softens the sarcasm by making the change of attitude less immediate in his treatment of the story while Charles Denis in his 1754 translation of La Fontaine lengthens the period further and explains the change as simply the effect of time.<ref>Select Fables pp.156-9</ref> 

La Fontaine's delicately ironical interpretation of the fable is reflected in later artistic treatments, such as Lambron Des Piltières' odd mixture of the Classical and the contemporary in La Jeune Veuve. But Ambrose Bierce brings a blacker humour to his Fantastic Fables, where the story is subverted under the title "The Inconsolable Widow". This tells of a passer-by attempting to comfort a woman weeping beside a grave with the assurance that 'there is another man somewhere, besides your husband, with whom you can still be happy'. The woman answers that she agrees, and that this is where he is buried.

Marc Chagall included an etching of the grieving widow among the set of illustrated fables he published in 1952. In 1995 Ida Gotkovsky (1933-) included it in her Hommage à Jean de La Fontaine for children's choir and orchestra; in 1999  Isabelle Aboulker set the fable for high voice and piano as the first of her four Femmes en fables''.

References

Fables by Laurentius Abstemius
La Fontaine's Fables